"Pa' Bailar" is an instrumental neotango song by Bajofondo, and the lead single from their second studio album Mar Dulce. This song features Japanese bandoneonist Ryōta Komatsu. The song is used as the theme of the Brazilian telenovela A Favorita.

Track list
Two editions have been released for the single. The 2007 release includes the album version, two remixes, a remixed version featuring vocals by Fernando Santullo and a (non-electro) tango version covered by Orquesta Los Maestros; the 2008 release includes the same tracks (in different order) plus a version featuring vocals by Mexican singer, composer and accordionist Julieta Venegas.
One of the released versions was remixed by Uruguayan DJs and producers duo Omar, an alternate remix by Omar has been released on their MySpace page.

Music videos
Two official videoclips were shot for the single, both promoted on TV.
One of the videos is about a man dancing in a train trying to get a woman's attention; he dances all the road and makes different things until everybody starts dancing and the woman joins him. This version was directed by Pablo Casacuberta.
The other version was directed by Picky Talarico, it shows a tango and electronic party.

The official videos and a video from a live performance in Poland have been released on the iTunes Store.

References and notes

External links
 

Bajofondo songs
Julieta Venegas songs
2007 singles
2008 singles
Song recordings produced by Gustavo Santaolalla
Songs written by Juan Campodónico
Songs written by Gustavo Santaolalla
Telenovela theme songs
2007 songs